Niels Nielsen may refer to:

Niels Nielsen (rower) (born 1939), Danish Olympic rower
Niels Nielsen (sailor) (1883–1961), Norwegian Olympic silver medalist in 1920
Niels Kristian Nielsen (1897–1972), Danish gymnast at the 1920 Summer Olympics
Niels Turin Nielsen (1887–1964), Danish gymnast at the 1908 and 1920 Summer Olympics
Niels Erik Nielsen (1893–1974), Danish gymnast at the 1920 Summer Olympics
Niels Nielsen (geographer) (1893–1981), Danish geographer
Niels Nielsen (mathematician) (1865–1931), Danish mathematician
Niels Nielsen (politician) (1869–1930), Danish-born Australian politician
Niels Åge Nielsen, Danish professor of Nordic languages
Niels Nielsen, caretaker of the Old Man of the Mountain

See also
Nils Nielsen
Nils Nilsen